In enzymology, a 3,7-dimethylquercetin 4'-O-methyltransferase is an enzyme that catalyzes the chemical reaction

S-adenosyl-L-methionine + 5,3',4'-trihydroxy-3,7-dimethoxyflavone  S-adenosyl-L-homocysteine + 5,3'-dihydroxy-3,7,4'-trimethoxyflavone

Thus, the two substrates of this enzyme are S-adenosyl methionine and 5,3',4'-trihydroxy-3,7-dimethoxyflavone (rhamnazin), whereas its two products are S-adenosylhomocysteine and 5,3'-dihydroxy-3,7,4'-trimethoxyflavone (ayanin).

This enzyme belongs to the family of transferases, specifically those transferring one-carbon group methyltransferases.  The systematic name of this enzyme class is S-adenosyl-L-methionine:5,3',4'-trihydroxy-3,7-dimethoxyflavone 4'-O-methyltransferase. Other names in common use include flavonol 4'-O-methyltransferase, flavonol 4'-methyltransferase, 4'-OMT, S-adenosyl-L-methionine:3',4',5-trihydroxy-3,7-dimethoxyflavone, 4'-O-methyltransferase, and 3,7-dimethylquercitin 4'-O-methyltransferase [mis-spelt].

References

 
 

EC 2.1.1
Enzymes of unknown structure